The Canton of Fougères-Nord is a former canton of France, in the Ille-et-Vilaine département. It had 22,494 inhabitants (2012). It was disbanded following the French canton reorganisation which came into effect in March 2015.

The canton comprised the following communes:

 Beaucé 
 La Chapelle-Janson 
 Fleurigné 
 Fougères (fraction) 
 Laignelet 
 Landéan 
 Le Loroux 
 Luitré 
 Parigné 
 La Selle-en-Luitré

References

Former cantons of Ille-et-Vilaine
2015 disestablishments in France
States and territories disestablished in 2015